Luke Thomas Norman (born 16 December 1971) is a former Australian rules footballer who played with Melbourne in the Australian Football League (AFL).

Norman was originally from Wangaratta and got selected by Melbourne with pick 68 in the 1994 National Draft. A defender, he made nine appearances in the 1995 AFL season and another seven in the 1996 season.

In 2004, Norman was appointed captain of West Adelaide in the South Australian National Football League and won their best and fairest award that year. He also captained the club in 2005.

He coached the Sturt reserves to a premiership in 2008 and took over as senior coach the following season. In his first year as coach he steered Sturt into the SANFL grand final, which they lost to Central District. He remained with the club for two more seasons.

References

External links
 
 

1971 births
Australian rules footballers from Victoria (Australia)
Melbourne Football Club players
Wangaratta Football Club players
West Adelaide Football Club players
Sturt Football Club coaches
Living people